Baqiabad may refer to:
 Baqiabad, Delhi, village in North East Delhi district of Delhi, India
 Baqiabad, Hormozgan, village in Khamir County, Hormozgan Province, Iran
 Baqiabad, Yazd, village in Yazd Province, Iran